Herda is a surname. Notable people with the surname include:

Dušan Herda (born 1951), Slovak footballer
Frank A. Herda (born 1947), United States Army soldier
Jozef Herda (1910–1985), Czechoslovak sport wrestler
Marian Herda (born 1933), Polish ice hockey player

See also
Hereditary equine regional dermal asthenia